Talas, formerly known as Dalassa (Greek: Δάλασσα) is a town and now largely suburban enclave in central Anatolia in the district of Kayseri Province in Turkey. The population of Talas city was 165,127 in 2020, up from 30,485 in 1990. It is located about 7 km from the city of Kayseri and has evolved from an independent town to a satellite city of Kayseri. Talas is connected to neighboring Kayseri by road and by the Kayseray mass transit system. The city has experienced rapid urbanization and population growth in the last 30 years.

History 
The history of Talas dates back to 1500 BC. Its name first appears in 1070 AD as Moutaláskê, when it was mentioned for the first time when referring to St. Sabas as Moutalaske. It is believed that in (1500 BC) the area was inhabited by Mazacs and later in (510 BC) Cappadocians, (312 BC) Kayrus, and later the Romans. Its name was later rendered as Dalassa (Greek: Δάλασσα).

Recent Chronological History
 1071-1168 Danishmendids Administration
 1077-1307 Seljuk Empire Administration
 "Mongol Invasion" in 1243
 1312-1388 Ilkhanids Administration
 1388-1446 Kadi Burhan al-Din Period
 1446-1467 "Karakhanids"
 1467-1923 Ottomans (Al-i Osman, Al-i Dulkadiriye, Ramazanoğulları, Egyptian Mamluk Comrade (1835))
 1923–Present Turkish Republic

In 1510, some of the Armenians, who were exposed to the pressure of the Safavid ruler Shah Ismail, settled around Talas. Talas later became one of the important Armenian settlements in Anatolia until its eventual destruction and evacuation in 1915 by members of the late Ottoman Empire. Following the establishment of Turkish Republic, Greeks in this region were deported to Greece by ships via Tarsus and Silifke during the Population exchange between Greece and Turkey. Today, there is a negligible presence of Armenian or Greek population in Talas.

Modern History
Talas has grown rapidly since 1980 as a result of its proximity to neighboring Kayseri. Kayseri is considered to be one of the Anatolian Tigers which were one of a number of cities in Turkey which have displayed impressive growth records since the 1980s. While Talas was long an independent and adjacent town it has now physically connected into the larger Kayseri region and has several major road and one mass transit connection via Kayseray. A more traditional Anatolian village aesthetic of older single family homes and gardens dominates the southern portion of Talas while the northern section is predominantly high-rise housing - much of which was initially developed by TOKİ. In 2014, Talas was connected to Kayseri via the Kayseray light rail system.

Geography 
The district is located at the foot of Mount Erciyes, which is 7 km to southeast of Kayseri. The altitude of the district is 1100 meters above sea level. The southern portion of the district has a rugged geographical structure while the north is primarily a flat Anatolian plain.

There are no streams or lakes. Lower Talas is a valley with an average altitude of 1100 meters, and Upper Talas is a plateau with an altitude of 1191 meters. Ali Mountain is located at an altitude of 1870 meters in the southeast of the district. Mount Ali is a volcanic mountain formed as a result of the eruption of Mount Erciyes. Winters are cold and snowy while the summers are hot and dry. Rain usually falls in the spring and autumn seasons. There is no forest in the district, it is covered with meadows and pastures. There are plateaus in the villages of Cebir, Çömlekçi and Kepez in the district. The district's geographical features have become less predominant with its urbanization.

Climate

Temperature 
The temperature in Talas starts to rise from March. It reaches its highest values in July and August. During summer months, the temperatures routinely reach 39 to 40 °C. With the effect of the continental climate, the night temperature may drop to lows around 10 °C. From September onwards, the temperature decreases continuously. This decline continues until the end of February. The winter season is regarded as severely cold and dry. The average winter temperature is -1, -2 °C. Snowfall occurs between November and April.

Precipitation 
Since the climate of the district has a continental climate, precipitation generally falls in the form of snow in winter and rain in spring. Since 2010, the annual precipitation average of 359.7mm per square meter. This is lower than the average for Turkey which is between 500mm and 600mm.

Population 
The population of Talas has grown rapidly between 1990 and 2020. In 1990, the city had a population of 30,485 which rose gradually to 34,879 in 2000. After 2000, the area rapidly urbanized with a population rising to 93,769 in 2010 and 165,127 in 2020.

Administrative structure 
While it was a town connected to Kayseri Liva before 1907, the town organization was established in 1907 and it became a sub-district of Kayseri in 1911. In 1987, it became a district with the Law No. 3392. The district has 5 town municipalities and 16 villages. As per the Metropolitan Municipality Law No. 5216, published in the Official Gazette dated 23.07.2004 and numbered 25531, Talas district became the central district and 4 villages turned into neighborhoods. These are Cebir, Akçakaya, Çatakdere and Yazılı.
 
Talas was historically a summer resort due to its proximity to Kayseri and its high landforms, though this trend has changed with its urbanization and improvement of transportation connections to the region.

The Armenian population of the district hosted the Greek Army Commander-in-Chief Trikupis and his entourage, who were captured in the Turkish War of Independence. Before the mass deportation of Armenians from the area, Talas was known as an important trade center in Anatolia.

The mayor of Talas is Mustafa Yalçın. He is a member of the AKP.

Economy 
There are small-scale furniture workshops and a textile factory built on ready-made clothing in the district. Erciyes University is located in Talas and employs a large population of professors and staff. As of 2019, the university had an undergraduate population of 56,103. With the extension of Kayseray to Talas, the city has evolved into a bedroom community to adjacent Kayseri which serves as the financial center of the larger region.

Gallery

Bibliography

See also 
 Kayseri Province
 Talas American College

External links 

 Kayseri Governorship Site

See also
 Talas American College

References

The information in this article is based on that in its Turkish equivalent.

Kayseri
Cities in Turkey
Districts of Kayseri Province
Populated places in Kayseri Province
Towns in Turkey